Andra Valley Dam, is an earthfill dam on Andra river near Maval, Pune district in state of Maharashtra in India.

Specifications

See also
 Dams in Maharashtra
 List of reservoirs and dams in India

References

Dams in Pune district
Dams completed in 2003
2003 establishments in Maharashtra